Aarup is  a railway town in central Denmark with a population of 3,259 (1 January 2022), located in Assens municipality on the island of Funen in Region of Southern Denmark.

Aarup can trace its history back to 1500, but it did not become a town until the 1860s. It was located in Skydebjerg-Orte municipality until 1966 and was the municipal seat of Aarup Municipality until 2007.

Notable people 
 Thorvald Andersen (1883 in Aarup - 1935 in Frederiksberg) a Danish architect
 Lydmor a Danish singer

References

Cities and towns in the Region of Southern Denmark
Populated places in Funen
Assens Municipality